"I've Got Love on My Mind" is a 1977 R&B/Soul song originally recorded by American singer Natalie Cole. Released from her third album, Unpredictable, and was certified Gold, selling over one million copies and has become one of her most successful and popular songs.

Charts
"I've Got Love on My Mind" spent five weeks at number one on the Hot Soul Singles chart and peaked at number five on the Billboard Hot 100 in 1977.

Weekly charts

Year-end charts

Certifications

References

1977 singles
Natalie Cole songs
Songs written by Marvin Yancy
Capitol Records singles
1977 songs
Rhythm and blues ballads
Soul ballads
1970s ballads